Lepšynė ('birch bolete place', formerly) is a village in Kėdainiai district municipality, in Kaunas County, in central Lithuania. According to the 2011 census, the village was uninhabited.

History 
Lepšynė was an estate of the Stankevičiai family at the beginning of the 20th century.

Demography

References

Villages in Kaunas County
Kėdainiai District Municipality